Ora Buford was an American Negro league pitcher in the 1910s.

Buford played for the Chicago Giants in 1914. In four recorded appearances on the mound, he posted a 5.71 ERA over 34.2 innings.

References

External links
Baseball statistics and player information from Baseball-Reference Black Baseball Stats and Seamheads

Year of birth missing
Year of death missing
Place of birth missing
Place of death missing
Chicago Giants players